Gertrud Seele (born in Berlin on 22 September 1917; died 12 January 1945) was a German nurse and social worker executed by the Nazis for helping Jews. 

 Outraged by persecution of the Jews in Germany, Seele took Jewish people into hiding in her home and arranged safe houses for those who were escaping the Nazis. She was arrested in 1944 having been denounced to the Gestapo and was then charged with; Aiding The Enemy and, Undermining Military Morale. Her request to see her daughter before her execution was denied. She was executed by guillotine.

References 

German social workers
People from Berlin executed at Plötzensee Prison
1917 births
1945 deaths
German women nurses
German nurses
20th-century German women